Albert Portas Soy (born 15 November 1973) is a Spanish former professional tennis player.

Career
Portas turned professional in 1994. He reached his career-high singles ranking of World No. 19 in October 2001.

His only top-level singles title came at the 2001 Hamburg Masters, a tournament in which his mastery of the drop shot (key to his defeat of Juan Carlos Ferrero in the final) earned him the nickname "Drop Shot Dragon". According to the BBC, Lleyton Hewitt said of Portas that "He sure hits a lot of drop shots, but he hits them so well, as well as anyone I have faced.". His final at Barcelona Open in 1997 was also very remarkable. En route to the final he defeated Gustavo Kuerten (eventual champion this same year of French Open), Marcelo Rios, and Carlos Moya, but lost in the final to Albert Costa. In 1999, Portas lost the final of San Marino defeated by his countryman Galo Blanco.

He coached WTA player Daniela Hantuchová in 2008–2009.

Performance timelines

Singles

Doubles

ATP career finals

Singles: 4 (1 title, 3 runner-ups)

Doubles: 4 (1 title, 3 runner-ups)

ATP Challenger and ITF Futures finals

Singles: 19 (8–11)

Doubles: 22 (12–10)

Wins over top 10 players

References

External links
 
 
 

1973 births
Living people
Spanish male tennis players
Tennis players from Catalonia
Tennis players from Barcelona
Universiade medalists in tennis
Universiade silver medalists for Spain
Medalists at the 1999 Summer Universiade